The Communauté de communes Baie de Somme Sud  is a former communauté de communes in the Somme département and in the Picardie région of France. It was created in December 1997. It was merged into the new Communauté d'agglomération de la Baie de Somme in January 2017.

Composition 
This Communauté de communes covers part of the Baie de Somme and includes 13 communes:
Arrest
Boismont
Brutelles
Cayeux-sur-Mer
Estrébœuf
Franleu
Lanchères
Mons-Boubert
Pendé
Saigneville
Saint-Blimont
Saint-Valery-sur-Somme
Vaudricourt

See also 
Communes of the Somme department

References 

Baie de Somme Sud